Yosvani Torres Gómez  (born June 14, 1980) is a Cuban professional baseball pitcher for Vegueros de Pinar del Río in the Cuban National Series.

Torres played for the Cuban national baseball team at the 2011 World Port Tournament and 2017 World Baseball Classic.

References

External links

1980 births
Living people
Cuban baseball players
Baseball pitchers
Vegueros de Pinar del Rio players
Sabuesos de Holquin players
Naranjas de Villa Clara players
2017 World Baseball Classic players
Baseball players at the 2015 Pan American Games
Pan American Games medalists in baseball
Pan American Games bronze medalists for Cuba
Medalists at the 2015 Pan American Games
People from Pinar del Río